Case Concerning Barcelona Traction, Light, and Power Company, Ltd [1970] ICJ 1 is a public international law case, concerning the abuse of rights.

Facts
Barcelona Traction, Light, and Power Company, Ltd was a corporation incorporated in Canada, with Toronto headquarters, that made and supplied electricity in Spain. It had issued bonds to non-Spanish investors, but during the Spanish Civil War (1936–1939), the Spanish government refused to allow BTLP to transfer currency to pay bondholders the interest that they were due. In 1948, a group of bondholders sued in Spain to declare that BTLP had defaulted on the ground that it had failed to pay the interest. The Spanish court allowed the claim. The business was sold, the surplus distributed to the bondholders, and a small amount was paid to shareholders. The shareholders in Canada succeeded in persuading Canada and other states to complain that Spain had denied justice and violated a series of treaty obligations. However, Canada eventually accepted that Spain had the right to prevent BTLP from transferring currency and to declare BTLP bankrupt. Of the shares, 88% were owned by Belgians. The Belgian government complained, insisting the Spanish government had not acted properly. It made an initial claim at the International Court of Justice in 1958 but later withdrew it to allow negotiations. Subsequent negotiations broke down, and a new claim was filed in 1962. Spain contended that Belgium had no standing because BTLP was a Canadian company.

Judgment
The International Court of Justice held that Belgium had no legal interest in the matter to justify it bringing a claim. Although Belgian shareholders suffered if a wrong was done to the company, it was only the company's rights that could have been infringed by Spain's actions. It would have been direct shareholder rights only (such as to dividends) that were affected, and the state of the shareholders would have an independent right of action. It was a general rule of international law that when an unlawful act was committed against a company, only the state of incorporation of the company could sue, and because Canada had chosen not to do so, that was the end. The idea of a "diplomatic protection" of shareholders was unsound because it would create confusion and insecurity in economic relations as shares are "widely scattered and frequently change hands". The court also decided that a state is bound to give the same legal protection to foreign investments and nationals for natural or legal persons when it admits them to its territory.

Padilla Nervo J wrote the following:

Significance 

The decision is important in public international law because it demonstrates the importance of protections of corporate nationality in nominal ("paper") terms over effective nationality (siège social) where the ownership effectively resides.  Unless a principle of law permits a country to espouse a national's claim in the ICJ, there cannot be an espousal.

The case is also important as it demonstrates how the concept of diplomatic protection under international law can apply equally to corporations as to individuals. It also expanded the notion of obligations owed  (in relation to everyone) in the international community.

See also
Public international law
 List of International Court of Justice cases
United States corporate law

Notes

References

International Court of Justice cases
1970 in case law